Joseph McKenna (1843–1926) was an Associate Justice of the United States Supreme Court. 

Joseph McKenna may also refer to:

 Joseph D. McKenna, American state legislator
 Joseph McKenna (Canada) (1862–1919), participant in negotiations with a number of indigenous peoples of Canada
 Joseph G. McKenna (1922–1973), American educator and member of the Congregation of Christian Brothers
 Joseph Neale McKenna (1819–1906), Irish banker and politician
 Joseph McKenna (wrestler), American freestyle wrestler
 Joe McKenna (born 1951), former Irish sportsperson
Joseph McKenna, member (Volunteer) of the Irish Republican Army